The IMOCA 60 class yacht Group LG 2 was designed by Finot-Conq and launched in 1995 after being made by MAG-JMV in Cherbourg in France. The Canadian skipper Gerry Rouf lost his life when the boat overturned in the southern ocean during the 1996-1997 Vendee Globe.

Racing results

References 

1990s sailing yachts
Sailing yachts designed by Finot-Conq
Sailboat type designs by Groupe Finot
Vendée Globe boats
IMOCA 60
Sailboat types built in France